At the 2002 Commonwealth Games, Wales was represented by the Commonwealth Games Council for Wales (CGCE). 228 athletes participated for Wales at the games.

Medals

| style="text-align:left; vertical-align:top;"|

Gold
 Jamie Arthur, Boxing - Lightweight 60 kg
 Nicole Cooke, Cycling - Road Race
 Johanne Brekke & Ceri Dallimore, Shooting - Women's Smallbore Rifle Prone Pairs
 Michaela Breeze, Weightlifting - 58 kg Snatch
 Dave Morgan, Weightlifting - 77 kg Clean and Jerk
 Dave Morgan, Weightlifting - 77 kg Combined

Silver
 Colin Jackson, Athletics - 110m hurdles
 Matt Elias, Athletics - 400m hurdles
 Iwan Thomas, Matt Elias, Jamie Baulch and Tim Benjamin, Athletics - 4 × 400 m relay
 Hayley Tullett, Athletics - 1500m
 Huw Pritchard, Cycling - 20 km Scratch Race
 Adam Robertson & Ryan Jenkins, Table Tennis - Men's Doubles
 Dave Morgan, Weightlifting - 77 kg Snatch
 Michaela Breeze, Weightlifting - 58 kg Clean and Jerk
 Michaela Breeze, Weightlifting - 58 kg Combined
 Leanda Cave, Women's Triathlon
 Derek Dowling, John Gronow & Kevin Woolmore, Lawn Bowls - Men's Triples EAD
 Jo Melen, Judo - Women's - -78 kg
 Angharad Sweet, Judo - Women's - +78 kg

Bronze
 David Roberts, Swimming - Multi-disability 100m freestyle
 Richard Vaughan, Badminton - Men's Singles
 Kevin Evans, Boxing - Super Heavyweight over 91 kg
 Robert Weale, Lawn Bowls - Men's Singles
 Anwen Butten & Joanna Weale, Lawn Bowls - Women's Doubles
 Wales, Lawn Bowls - Men's Fours
 Wales, Lawn Bowls - Women's Fours
 Michael Wixey, Shooting - Men's Olympic Trap Pairs
 Gary Cole, Judo - Men's -60 kg
 Claire Scourfield, Judo - Women's -63 kg
 Timothy Davies, Judo - Men's -66 kg
 Luke Preston, Judo - Men's -81 kg

Results by event

Field Hockey

Men's Team Competition
Team Roster
George Harris
Paul Edwards
Richard John
Rhys Joyce
Matthew Grace
Zach Jones
Mark Hoskin
James Westerman
James Davies-Yandle
Josh Smith
Simon Organ
Chris Ashcroft
Howard Hoskin
James Ogden
Owen Griffiths-Jones
Huw Jones

Shooting

Clay Target

Pistol
Cartridge Pistol

Air Pistol

Small Bore and Air Rifle
Men

Women

Full Bore
Open

See also
 Wales at the Commonwealth Games

References

Nations at the 2002 Commonwealth Games
2002
2002 in Welsh sport